Humboldt Glacier is one of the major glaciers in northern Greenland. 

The glacier is named after German naturalist Alexander von Humboldt and is the widest tidewater glacier in the Northern Hemisphere.

Geography
The Humboldt Glacier borders the Kane Basin in North West Greenland. It has been retreating in the period of observation spanning 1975–2010. 

Humboldt Glacier fringes the coast of Peabody Bay from north to south. The McGary Islands lie off the glacier at the southern end of the bay.

See also
List of glaciers in Greenland
Peabody Bay

References

External links 

Glaciers of Greenland